Vasily Mihailovich Tchernetzov (March 3, 1890 – January 23, 1918) was a Don Cossack Russian Imperial Army officer who served as a colonel in the Don Army during the Russian Civil War. He led Tchernetzov's Partisans, an independent irregular Don Cossacks military company commissioned after the Act of Ataman by Alexey Kaledin on November 7, 1917.

Awards

 Order of St. Anna of 4th degree 
 Order of St. Anna of 3rd degree
 Order of Saint Stanislaus of 3rd degree
 Order of Saint Stanislaus of 2nd degree
 Order of St. Vladimir of 4th degree
 Gold Sword for Bravery

Literature
The deaths of Colonel Tchernetzov and his Partisans by Bolsheviks are part of the plot of the Mikhail Sholokhov novel And Quiet Flows the Don.

References

 Monument to Tchernetzov at Rostov-on-Don
 V.M. Tchernetzov and Tchernetzov's Partisans
 Biography of Vasily Tchernetzov on Hrono.info
 Vasily Tchernetzov on Ruguard.ru
 Partizan Vasily Tchernetzov and idea of Free Don Republic

1890 births
1918 deaths
Cossacks from the Russian Empire
Anti-communists from the Russian Empire
Russian military personnel of World War I
People of the Russian Civil War
White movement people
Don Cossacks
Recipients of the Order of St. Anna, 4th class
Recipients of the Order of St. Vladimir
Recipients of the Gold Sword for Bravery
Recipients of the Order of St. Anna, 3rd class